Motordrome is an archaic placename in Los Angeles County, California. It designates a rail spur that existed in the 1910s on the Redondo Beach via Del Rey Line, named for the Los Angeles Motordrome race track and airfield.

Even though the racetrack was destroyed in a fire in 1913, and the rails were removed by 1918, the place name persisted on USGS survey maps until at least the 1930s.

The Barnes Circus train partially derailed at Motordrome in 1914, injuring four.

Motordrome station lay at an elevation of 7 feet (2 m).

The coordinates for Motordrome preserved in the GNIS place it near the present-day intersections of Jefferson Boulevard and Culver Boulevard, in what is now the Ballona Wetlands Ecological Reserve.

See also
 Alla, California
 Alsace, California
 Cypress Grove, California
 Machado, California

References

External links
 “Birdseye view of resorts near Los Angeles, California” incl Motordrome (via LMU Digital Collections)

Former settlements in Los Angeles County, California
Former populated places in California